SOGA2, also known as Suppressor of glucose autophagy associated 2 or CCDC165, is a protein that in humans is encoded by the SOGA2 gene.
SOGA2 has two human paralogs, SOGA1 and SOGA3.
In humans, the gene coding sequence is 151,349 base pairs long, with an mRNA of 6092 base pairs, and a protein sequence of 1586 amino acids. The SOGA2 gene is conserved in gorilla, baboon, galago, rat, mouse, cat, and more. There is distant conservation seen in organisms such as zebra finches and anoles.
SOGA2 is ubiquitously expressed in humans, with especially high expression in brain (especially the cerebellum and hippocampus), colon, pituitary gland, small intestine, spinal cord, testis and fetal brain.

Gene

Locus
The SOGA2 gene is located from 8717369 - 8832775 on the short arm of chromosome 18 (18p11.22).

Homology and Evolution

Paralogs

There are two main paralogs to SOGA2: human protein SOGA1 and human protein SOGA3. SOGA1 has been shown to be involved in suppression of glucose by autophagy. The rate at which orthologs diverge from SOGA2 human(measured by % identity) places the approximate duplication event of SOGA1 from SOGA2 at ~254.1 MYA and the duplication event of SOGA3 from SOGA2 ~329.1 MYA.

Orthologs
Many orthologs have been identified in Eukaryotes.

Distant Homologs

Homologous Domains

SOGA2 is conserved farthest back in its N-terminal region, where it contains its three domains of unknown function.

Protein

Protein internal composition 

SOGA2 is rich in glycine (ratio r of SOGA2 composition to average human protein is 1.723), glutamate (r = 1.647), and arginine
(r = 1.357). It also has a lower than usual composition of tyrosine (r = 0.3406), isoleucine (r = 0.4430),
phenylalanine (r = 0.5808), and valine (r = 0.6161).

Primary structure and isoforms
SOGA2 has 4 isoforms: Q9Y4B5-1, Q9Y4B5-2, Q9Y4B5-3, Q9Y4B5-4.

Domains and motifs 

SOGA2 contains Domain of Unknown Function 4201 (DUF4201) from aa 16-235. This domain is specific to the Coiled Coil Domain Containing family of proteins in eukaryotes. It also contains two copies of Domain of Unknown Function 3166 (DUF3166): one from aa 140-235 and one from aa 269-364.

Post-translational modifications 
SOGA2 is expected to undergo a number of post-translational modifications. Modifications of human SOGA2 that are shared by orthologs include:

 Sumoylation at amino acids 87, 152, 235, 392, and 1379.
 Sulfination at tyrosines 14 and 1249.
 Phosphorylation at a number of sites, highlighted in the following graphic:

Secondary structure
The consensus of the prediction software PELE, GOR4, and SOSUICoil  is that the secondary structure of SOGA2 is dominated by alpha helices with interspersed regions of random coil. GOR4 indicated that SOGA2 is dominated by alpha-helices; it predicted a mere 5.61% of
residues in an extended strand (parallel or antiparallel Beta-sheet) conformation, as opposed to
47.79% alpha helix and 46.6% random coils.

Tertiary structure
SOGA2 shares sequence features in its highly conserved N-terminal region. This homology allows prediction of its tertiary structure on the basis of homology to published 3d structures via Phyre2 and NCBI structure.

Gene expression

Promoter 
The promoter for human SOGA2 is below.

Gene expression data
The EST profile shows that, in humans, SOGA2 is highly expressed in many sites throughout the body, including bone, brain, ear, eye, and many others. There are a large number of transcripts in liver cancer samples. Human microarray data show that SOGA2 is moderately expressed, with especially high expression in brain (especially the cerebellum and hippocampus), colon, pituitary gland, small intestine, spinal cord, testis and fetal brain. Brain-tissue-specific microarray data show that SOGA2 has high expression throughout the posterior lobe of the cerebellar hemispheres and posterial lobe of the vermis in the mouse brain. There is low expression in most other areas of the brain.

Transcript variants 
In humans, the SOGA2 gene produces 17 different transcripts, 8 of which form a protein product (one undergoes nonsense mediated decay). The main transcript in humans is transcript ID ENST00000359865, or SOGA2-001.

Function

Possible transcription factors 

Possible transcription factors for human SOGA2 include:

Modulator recognition factor 2
cAMP-responsive element binding protein 1
alternative splicing variant of FOXP1
MDS1/EVI1-like gene 1
Ikaros 2, possible regulator of lymphocyte differentiation

Interactions 

Protein complex co-immunoprecipitation (Co-IP) experiments revealed interacting proteins such as cell death regulators, ATP-binding cassette (ABC) transporters and protein kinase A binding proteins.

The 540 interacting proteins include ABCF1, ACTB, ACTL6A, BCLAF1, BCLAF1, CHEK1, and MAGEE2.

K-nearest neighbor analysis by wolf pSort indicates that in humans, SOGA2 is focused mainly in the nucleus, cytoplasm, and the cytonuclear
space. There is a small chance that it is localizes to the golgi.

A number of protein interactants were also identified via the STRING database, including MARK2, MARK4, and PPP2R2B.

Clinical significance 

SOGA2 has no currently known disease associations or mutations.

References

Further reading